Mirzaye Shirazi Metro Station is a station in line 3 of the Tehran Metro. It is located on Shahid Behesthi Street's intersection with Mirza-ye Shirazi Street in Central Tehran's District 6. The station was opened on February 10, 2016.

References

Tehran Metro stations